Virtuosi is an album by drummer Barry Altschul, pianist Paul Bley and bassist Gary Peacock recorded in 1967 and released on Bley's own Improvising Artists label in 1976.

Reception

Allmusic awarded the album 2½ stars noting "Although Altschul gets first billing, this is really an outing by Bley's trio. With its many wandering sections, the somewhat aimless and often-boring set is definitely a lesser effort and is far from essential".

Track listing
 "Butterflies" (Annette Peacock) - 15:54  
 "Gary" (Peacock) - 17:10

Personnel 
Paul Bley - piano
Gary Peacock - bass  
Barry Altschul - drums

References 

1976 albums
Paul Bley albums
Barry Altschul albums
Improvising Artists Records albums